Terry Wayne Wallis (April 7, 1964 – March 29, 2022) was an American man from the Ozark Mountains of Arkansas who, on June 11, 2003, regained awareness after spending 19 years in a minimally conscious state.

Early life
Wallis was born on April 7, 1964, in Marianna, Arkansas, to Angilee and Jerry Wallis. Six weeks before his accident, Wallis became a father when his wife Sandi gave birth to a daughter.

Accident
On July 13, 1984, Wallis was driving his pickup truck with two passengers when it smashed into a railing fence on a small bridge near Stone County, Arkansas, and skid over the edge. The accident killed one of the two passengers. Aged 20, Wallis was found unresponsive but breathing, with significant injuries. He remained comatose and quadriplegic and was moved to a Mountain View nursing home.

Within a year of the accident, the coma stabilized into a minimally-conscious state, but doctors believed that his condition was permanent.

Awakening
In 2003, Wallis spontaneously awoke and began talking. When a nurse asked him who the woman walking toward him was, he identified her as "mama." He believed that he was still 20 and that it was still 1984. His muscles remained weak but he gradually experienced limited recovery over a three-day "awakening period" in which he regained the ability to control some parts of his body and to speak to others. However, he remained disabled, including the motor speech disorder dysarthria. 

"His mother and all of his family cared for him relentlessly during his coma and afterwards,” according to his obituary. “His family would bring him home on alternate weekends for years. Doctors believe that this stimulation contributed to his awakening period.”

Wallis was the subject of the BodyShock special for 2005 "The Man Who Slept For 19 Years" made for Channel 4 in the UK. It showed his mother and daughter encouraging him to talk to neurologists to try to find out how he had regained speech after such a long time. The program featured several prominent physicians, including Caroline McCagg, the medical director of the JFK Center for head injury in New Jersey; Joe Giacino, a neuropsychologist who said that Wallis' brain retained a lot of information from before 1984 but little after 1984, because he had lost the ability to store new memories and so was effectively amnestic; and Martin Gizzi, a neurologist who showed that damage to the frontal lobes made Wallis unable to process experiences into memories. Also featured in the program was the neuropsychologist Roger Llewellyn Wood.

Using new technology, brain scans were done on Wallis by Nicholas Schiff of Weill Cornell Medical College. The hypothesis built from the imaging studies is that Wallis' brain reconnected neurons that remained intact and formed new connections to circumvent damaged areas.

Death
Wallis died in Searcy, Arkansas, on March 29, 2022, at the age of 57.

See also
 List of people who awoke from a coma
 Persistent vegetative state

References

External links
Patient Revives After 19 Years By Rewiring Brain mini-article and discussion on Slashdot, July 2006
'Miracle recovery' shows brain's resilience on Nature.com, July 2006
Terry Wallis, a modern Lazarus on everything2.com, Updated in January 2004
Mayo Clinic Proceedings: Minimally Conscious State vs Persistent Vegetative State: The Case of Terry (Wallis) vs. The Case of Terri (Schiavo)
A discussion about brain regeneration, Video interview with researchers on the Charlie Rose Show, July 28, 2006

1964 births
2022 deaths
People from Marianna, Arkansas
People from Stone County, Arkansas
People with severe brain damage
People with traumatic brain injuries
People who awoke from permanent coma like states